Barry Hulbert (born 1951) was an Australian rugby league footballer who played in the 1970s.

An aspiring Port Kembla five-eighth, 21 year old Hulbert was selected for County Firsts to play City Firsts on 20 May 1972 at the Sydney Cricket Ground. His Country Firsts team was captained by Warren Ryan. 

Two years later in 1974 on a recommendation from Graeme Langlands, Hulbert joined the St. George Dragons for three years, playing 40 first grade games before returning to Wollongong rugby league in 1977.

References

St. George Dragons players
Australian rugby league players
Living people
Place of birth missing (living people)
Rugby league five-eighths
Country New South Wales rugby league team players
1951 births